Kolangal is a 1995 Indian Tamil-language drama film directed by I. V. Sasi. The film stars Jayaram and Kushboo. It was released on 15 September 1995.

Plot 

Ganga, a Tamil girl who doesn't know Hindi, looks for her friend Malini in Mumbai. She then meets Bairavan, a Tamil man, who says that he knows Malini and Bairavan then sells Ganga to a brothel. The Tamil Nadu Police raids at the brothel to rescue Tamil women and they save most of them including the innocent Ganga.

Anand , a police officer, is worried about Ganga and she tells him about her past. After Ganga's father died, Ganga lived in her sister's house but her brother-in-law tried to rape her. She left the house and decided to go to Mumbai. So, Anand drops Ganga in her sister's house and to Anand's surprise, her angry brother-in-law beat her in front of him. Anand intervenes and saves her. Anand secretly marries her.

Anand's family is a traditional Hindu joint family and they all live in a bungalow. He has a widowed mother Karpagam, a bachelor uncle Sundarapandi, an elder brother Shankar and a sister-in-law Archana who have two children, a little brother Vijay who loves Sangeetha and a little sister Uma who loves Rajesh. Everybody blesses the young couple except Archana who wanted Anand to marry her sister Anjali. Soon, Bairavan surfaces and begins to blackmail Anand. Anand manages it intelligently but his family finds out that Ganga was in a brothel. It leads the entire family into a trauma. What transpires later forms the crux of the story.

Cast 

Jayaram as Anand
Kushboo as Ganga
Raghuvaran as Bairavan
Raja as Rajesh
Kasthuri as Uma
Sarath Babu as Shankar
Vaishnavi as Archana
Sanjay as Vijay
Sanghavi as Sangeetha
K. R. Vijaya as Karpagam
R. Sundarrajan as Sundarapandi
Senthil as Muruga
Vasuki as Anjali
Nassar
Nizhalgal Ravi as Ganga's brother-in-law
Delhi Ganesh as Raghunatha Sethupathi, Rajesh's father
Vijaya Chandrika as Rajesh's mother
Sharmili as Saroja
Kumari Muthu
R. N. R. Manohar as Madhavan, a journalist

Production 
The film was initially set to be directed by Bharathan, who was later replaced by I. V. Sasi. During production, reports emerged that Sasi was to be replaced by Pratap Pothan and that Arvind Swamy was set to join the cast, but no changes were made.

Awards 
1995 Tamil Nadu State Film Awards
 Won – Best Film (second prize)
 Won – Best Actress – Kushboo

Soundtrack 
The film score and the soundtrack were composed by Ilaiyaraaja. The soundtrack, released in 1995, features 6 tracks with lyrics written by Vaali.

Reception
Thulasi of Kalki praised the film for its story, simple and natural dialogues, lively characters and cinematography.

References

External links 

1990s Tamil-language films
1995 drama films
1995 films
Films about prostitution in India
Films directed by I. V. Sasi
Films scored by Ilaiyaraaja
Indian drama films